Sceloporus exsul, the Queretaran desert lizard, is a species of lizard in the family Phrynosomatidae. It is endemic to Mexico.

References

Sceloporus
Endemic reptiles of Mexico
Reptiles described in 1972
Taxa named by James R. Dixon